Anderson Ebberson (1843–1916) was an American politician.

He served in the Arkansas House of Representatives in 1877 and 1881, representing Jefferson County, Arkansas, as a Republican.

In the 1876 elections he was one of eight blacks to win seats in the general assembly, seven representatives and one in the senate. He was one of three representatives for Jefferson County, Arkansas, serving alongside C. H. Rice and William Murphy.
All three representatives for Jefferson County, Arkansas in 1881, Ebberson, W. C. Payne and Carl Polk were black.

In 1886 he was convicted of involuntary manslaughter of Thomas Cotton and sentenced to one year in prison.

See also
African-American officeholders during and following the Reconstruction era

References

External links 
 His photograph was included in a composite of members of the House in 1881 (Image No.1)

African-American politicians during the Reconstruction Era
Arkansas politicians convicted of crimes
Republican Party members of the Arkansas House of Representatives
1843 births
1916 deaths
19th-century American politicians
Politicians from Jefferson County, Arkansas
African-American state legislators in Arkansas
20th-century African-American people